Breakfast Dance and Barbecue is a live album by pianist, composer and bandleader Count Basie and his Orchestra with vocalist Joe Williams featuring tracks recorded at a Disc Jockey convention in Florida in 1959 and originally released on the Roulette label.

Reception

AllMusic awarded the album 3 stars and its review by Scott Yanow states, "Their first of three sets took place at 2 a.m. but the late hour if anything kept the band loose".

Track listing
 "The Deacon" (Thad Jones) – 5:52 Bonus track on CD reissue
 "Cute" (Neal Hefti) – 4:09 Bonus track on CD reissue
 "In a Mellow Tone" (Duke Ellington, Milt Gabler) – 6:53
 "No Moon at All" (David Mann, Redd Evans) – 2:57 Bonus track on CD reissue
 "Cherry Red" (Pete Johnson, Big Joe Turner) – 2:39 Bonus track on CD reissue
 "Roll 'Em Pete" (Johnson, Turner) – 2:38 Bonus track on CD reissue	
 "Cherry Point" (Hefti) – 4:10 Bonus track on CD reissue
 "Splanky" (Hefti) – 4:15 Bonus track on CD reissue	
 "Counter Block" (Jones) – 4:34 Bonus track on CD reissue
 "Li'l Darlin'" (Hefti) – 4:07 Bonus track on CD reissue
 "Who, Me?" (Frank Foster) – 3:59
 "Five O'Clock in the Morning" (Joe Williams) – 2:53
 "Every Day I Have the Blues" (Memphis Slim) – 3:48 Bonus track on CD reissue	
 "Back to the Apple" (Count Basie, Frank Foster) – 5:33 Bonus track on CD reissue
 "Let's Have a Taste" (Snooky Young) – 4:17
 "Moten Swing" (Bennie Moten, Buster Moten) – 5:17
 "Hallelujah I Love Her So" (Ray Charles) – 2:36
 "One O'Clock Jump" (Count Basie) – 3:45

Personnel 
Count Basie – piano
Joe Williams – vocals
Wendell Culley, Thad Jones, Joe Newman, Snooky Young – trumpet
Henry Coker, Al Grey, Benny Powell – trombone
Marshal Royal, Frank Wess – alto saxophone
Frank Foster, Billy Mitchell – tenor saxophone
Charlie Fowlkes – baritone saxophone
Freddie Green – guitar
Eddie Jones – bass
Sonny Payne – drums
Harry Edison – trumpet (track 18)

References 

1959 live albums
Count Basie Orchestra live albums
Roulette Records live albums
Albums produced by Teddy Reig